Wendell Thomas Anderson (April 26, 1929 – March 23, 2009) was an American politician from Georgia.

Early life and education
Anderson was born in Canton, Georgia, in 1929. After graduating from Canton High School in 1948, he worked as an electrical contractor. He was employed by Lockheed Aircraft, and then Southern Railway.

Political career
Anderson's political career began in 1967, when he began serving on the Cherokee County Board of Education. He remained on the board until his election to the Georgia House of Representatives in 1976.

A member of the Democratic Party, Anderson served in the state house for 10 years.

Personal life
Anderson was a lifelong Methodist. He died on March 23, 2009, and was survived by his wife and two children.

References

1929 births
Democratic Party members of the Georgia House of Representatives
20th-century American politicians
2009 deaths